Dalby is a town in Faxe Municipality, in Region Zealand, Denmark.

Notes 

Cities and towns in Region Zealand
Faxe Municipality